Four ships in the United States Navy have been named USS Supply.

 , a sailing ship purchased in 1846 for service in the Mexican–American War which later served in the American Civil War.
 , an iron steamer purchased by the Navy in 1898 which served in the Spanish–American War and the First World War.
 , an aviation supply ship, built in 1921, acquired by the Navy in 1944 and decommissioned in 1946.
 , the lead ship of Supply-class of fast combat support ships was commissioned in 1994, decommissioned from active duty and transferred to MSC in 2001.

United States Navy ship names